This is an incomplete list of the Serbia and Montenegro national football team matches.

FR Yugoslavia

1994

1995

1996

1997

1998

1999

2000

2001

2002

Serbia and Montenegro

2003

2004

2005

2006

See also
 Serbia national football team results
 Montenegro national football team results

References

External links
Results at RSSSF 

Serbia and Montenegro national football team results